The inferior tympanic canaliculus is a small  passage of the tympanic branch of the glossopharyngeal nerve and inferior tympanic artery.
In the bony ridge dividing the carotid canal from the jugular fossa is the small inferior tympanic canaliculus. The inferior tympanic canaliculus is near the fossula petrosa which houses inferior ganglion of glossopharyngeal nerve/petrous ganglion from which the tympanic nerve arises.

References

Foramina of the skull